The Colonia Juárez Chihuahua Mexico Temple is the 55th operating temple of the Church of Jesus Christ of Latter-day Saints (LDS Church).

On a hill just west of the little town of Colonia Juárez, in the Mexican state of Chihuahua, and overlooking a fertile valley, sits the first of the smaller LDS temples to be completed outside of the United States. As of 2017, the Colonia Juárez Chihuahua México Temple is the smallest temple the LDS Church operates.

Colonia Juárez is about two hundred miles southwest of the U.S.–Mexico border at El Paso, Texas, and Ciudad Juárez, Chihuahua. The small town consists of two stores, three restaurants, several schools, and numerous farms. The Colonia Juárez Chihuahua México Temple serves church members from the United States and Mexico. During the final stages of construction, church members from both countries worked together on landscaping, cleaning both the interior and exteriors of the temple, and washing windows.

LDS Church president Gordon B. Hinckley dedicated the Colonia Juárez Chihuahua Mexico Temple on March 6, 1999.

See also

 Comparison of temples of The Church of Jesus Christ of Latter-day Saints
 List of temples of The Church of Jesus Christ of Latter-day Saints
 List of temples of The Church of Jesus Christ of Latter-day Saints by geographic region
 Temple architecture (Latter-day Saints)
 The Church of Jesus Christ of Latter-day Saints in Mexico

References

External links
 Official Colonia Juárez Chihuahua Mexico Temple page
 Colonia Juárez Chihuahua Mexico Temple page

20th-century Latter Day Saint temples
Buildings and structures in Chihuahua (state)
Temples (LDS Church) completed in 1999
Temples (LDS Church) in Mexico
1999 establishments in Mexico